The 2019 season of the Shpageeza Cricket League was the sixth edition of the Shpageeza, a professional Twenty20 cricket (T20) league established by the Afghanistan Cricket Board (ACB) in 2013, and the second edition to have official T20 status. The tournament featured the six regional teams that played in the previous season. The event took place between 9 and 18 October 2019, with the Alokozay Kabul International Cricket Ground hosting all the matches. The number of overseas players participating was significantly reduced from the previous edition, with the subsequent launch of the Afghanistan Premier League making that the main franchise Twenty20 league run by the ACB.

Mis Ainak Knights won the tournament, after they beat Band-e-Amir Dragons by four wickets in the final. Noor Ali Zadran (Mis Ainak Knights) was the leading run-scorer in the tournament with 354, and Nijat Masood (Band-e-Amir Dragons) took the most wickets with 11.

Round-robin

Points table

Fixtures

Knockout-stage

References

External links 
 Series home on ESPN Cricinfo

Shpageeza Cricket League
Shpageeza Cricket League
Shpageeza Cricket League